Rod Doyle is an Australian former professional rugby league footballer who played in the 1990s. He played for Eastern Suburbs, St. George and South Queensland in the NSWRL/ARL competitions and for Sheffield in the Super League

Background
Doyle is the younger brother of former professional rugby league player Jeff Doyle.

Playing career
Doyle made his first grade debut for St. George in round 11 of the 1990 NSWRL season against Western Suburbs. Doyle only played seven games for St. George before transferring to Eastern Suburbs. Doyle played a total of ten games with Easts before signing with the newly admitted South Queensland team for the 1995 ARL season. Doyle made his club debut for South Queensland in round 22 against defending premiers Canberra which ended in a 58-4 loss. The following year, Doyle played six games for the club as they finished with the Wooden Spoon. In 1997, he signed for English side Sheffield. Doyle played at lock for Sheffield in their 1998 Challenge Cup final victory over Wigan. It is considered one of the biggest upsets in the competitions history. Doyle played a total of 68 games for Sheffield and departed the club at the end of the 1999 season.

References

South Queensland Crushers players
St. George Dragons players
Sydney Roosters players
Sheffield Eagles players
1969 births
Australian rugby league players
Rugby league five-eighths
Rugby league locks
Living people